Drug withdrawal, drug withdrawal syndrome, or substance withdrawal syndrome, is the group of symptoms that occur upon the abrupt discontinuation or decrease in the intake of pharmaceutical or recreational (illicit) drugs.

In order for the symptoms of withdrawal to occur, one must have first developed a form of drug dependence. This may occur as physical dependence, psychological dependence or both. Drug dependence develops from consuming one or more substances over a period of time.

Dependence arises in a dose-dependent manner and produces withdrawal symptoms that vary with the type of drug that is consumed. For example, prolonged use of an antidepressant medication is likely to cause a rather different reaction when discontinued compared to discontinuation of an opioid, such as heroin. Withdrawal symptoms from opiates include anxiety, sweating, vomiting, and diarrhea. Alcohol withdrawal symptoms include irritability, fatigue, shaking, sweating, and nausea. Withdrawal from nicotine can cause irritability, fatigue, insomnia, headache, and difficulty concentrating. Many prescription and legal nonprescription substances can also cause withdrawal symptoms when individuals stop consuming them, even if they were taken as directed by a physician.

The route of administration, whether intravenous, intramuscular, oral or otherwise, can also play a role in determining the severity of withdrawal symptoms. There are different stages of withdrawal as well; generally, a person will start to feel bad (crash or come down), progress to feeling worse, hit a plateau, and then the symptoms begin to dissipate. However, withdrawal from certain drugs (barbiturates, benzodiazepines, alcohol, glucocorticoids) can be fatal. While it is seldom fatal to the user, withdrawal from opiates (and some other drugs) can cause miscarriage, due to fetal withdrawal. The term "cold turkey" is used to describe the sudden cessation of use of a substance and the ensuing physiologic manifestations.

The symptoms from withdrawal may be even more dramatic when the drug has masked prolonged malnutrition, disease, chronic pain, infections (common in intravenous drug use), or sleep deprivation, conditions that drug abusers often develop as a secondary consequence of the drug. When the drug is removed, these conditions may resurface and be confused with withdrawal symptoms. Genes that encode for the Alpha5 Nicotinic Acetylcholine Receptor affect nicotine and alcohol withdrawal symptoms.

Effect on homeostasis 
Homeostasis is the body's ability to maintain a certain chemical equilibrium in the brain and throughout the body. Homeostasis is impacted in many ways by drug usage and withdrawal. The internal systems perpetuate homeostasis by using different counter-regulatory methods in order to create a new state of balance based on the presence of the drug in the system. These methods include adapting the body's levels of neurotransmitters, hormones, and other substances present to adjust for the addition of the drug to the body.

Substances 

Examples (and ICD-10 code) of withdrawal syndrome include:
 F10.3 alcohol withdrawal syndrome (which can lead to delirium tremens)
 F11.3 opioid withdrawal, including methadone withdrawal
 F12.3 cannabis withdrawal
 F13.3 benzodiazepine withdrawal
 F14.3 cocaine withdrawal
 F15.3 caffeine withdrawal
 F17.3 nicotine withdrawal

Prescription medicine 
As noted above, many drugs should not be stopped abruptly without the advice and supervision of a physician, especially if the medication induces dependence or if the condition they are being used to treat is potentially dangerous and likely to return once medication is stopped, such as diabetes, asthma, heart conditions and many psychological or neurological conditions, like  epilepsy, depression, hypertension, schizophrenia and psychosis. The stopping of antipsychotics in schizophrenia and psychoses needs monitoring. The stopping of antidepressants for example, can lead to antidepressant discontinuation syndrome. With careful physician attention, however, medication prioritization and discontinuation can decrease costs, simplify prescription regimens, decrease risks of adverse drug events and poly-pharmacy, focus therapies where they are most effective, and prevent cost-related under-use of medications.

Medication Appropriateness Tool for Comorbid Health Conditions in Dementia (MATCH-D) warns that people with dementia are more likely to experience adverse effects, and to monitor carefully for withdrawal symptoms when ceasing medications for these people as they are both more likely to experience symptoms and less likely to be able to reliably report symptoms.

Anti-hypertensive drugs 

The latest evidence does not have evidence of an effect due to discontinuing vs continuing medications used for treating elevated blood pressure or prevention of heart disease in older adults on all-case mortality and incidence of heart attack. The findings are based on low quality evidence suggesting it may be safe to stop anti-hypertensive medications. However, older adults should not stop any of their medications without talking to a healthcare professional.

See also 
 Chemical dependency
 Craving, a psychological withdrawal symptom
 Drug detoxification
 Drug tolerance
 Hangover
 Neonatal withdrawal
 Rebound effect
 Post-acute withdrawal syndrome (PAWS)

References 

Drug rehabilitation
Substance-related disorders
Withdrawal syndromes